Ecclesiastical peerages (literally "ecclesiastical dignity") have traditionally been given to ordained members of the Thai sangha, the community of the Buddhist monks of Thailand.

Each ecclesiastical peer holds a rank and a title. For example, Phra Dharma Kośācārya is the title of a monk holding the rank of phra rachakhana in the dharma class. In addition to an ecclesiastical peerage, a monk may also be known by a layname (name as a layperson) and a dharmic name.

Holders of certain ranks are given .

History

The custom of giving peerages to Buddhist priests originated in Sri Lanka and is believed to have been practiced in Thailand since the time of the Sukhothai Kingdom, during which the Sri Lanka's sect of Buddhism known as Laṅkāvaṃśa was prevalent in the region and it appears that Srī Śraddhā, a nephew of King Pha Mueang, a local leader at that time, even travelled to the isle of Sri Lanka where he was ordained as a priest and was given a peerage. Stone inscriptions of that time mention such ecclesiastical titles as Mahāthēra and Mahāsvāmī.

During the reign of King Mahathammaracha II of Sukhothai, the Buddhist community of Sukhothai was divided into two sects: araṇyavāsī (literally "forest dwellers") and gāmavāsī (literally "village dwellers"). The patriarchs of both sects held the title Mahāthēra.

In the Ayutthaya Kingdom, the gāmavāsī sect was again divided into two subsects: the northern sect and the southern sect. The patriarchs of the northern sect were styled Phra Vanaratna or Phra Banaratna and those of the southern sect were styled Phra Buddhaghoṣācārya, whilst the patriarchs of the araṇyavāsī sect were styled Phra Buddhācārya. It is also believed that senior monks had been appointed by the monarch of Ayuthaya as supreme patriarchs in charge of the entire monastic community.

In the subsequent kingdoms of Thon Buri and Rattanakosin, the same custom was practiced until the enactment of the Sangha Administration Statute 1902 by King Rama V, which established a Sangha Supreme Council to nominate monks to the monarch to be appointed to peerages. This is upheld in the present Sangha Act 1962, except the appointment of the supreme patriarch which has been amended in January 2017 to solely be at the monarch's pleasure in line with the previous tradition.

Ranks and titles

At present, the ranks and titles given to members of the Thai sangha are as follows (from highest to lowest):

Supreme patriarch

Supreme patriarch is the highest rank in the Thai sangha. A supreme patriarch who is a member of the royal family is called somdet phra sangkharat chao, whilst one who is a commoner is merely called somdet phra sangkharat.

At present, all the supreme patriarchs are appointed by the monarch of Thailand and are titled Ariyavaṃśāgatañāṇa, prefixed by the honorific Somdet Phra.

Somdet phra rachakhana

Somdet phra rachakhana is the second highest rank in the Thai sangha after the supreme patriarch. At present, somdet phra rachakhana are appointed by the monarch of Thailand and there can only be eight somdet phra rachakhana: four from the Mahā Nikāya sect and the other four from the Dhammayuttika Nikāya sect.

The titles for somdet phra rachakhana, each prefixed by the honorific Somdet Phra, are as follows:

Phra rachakhana

Phra rachakhana is the third highest rank in the Thai sangha, divided into two classes: special and ordinary.

At present, phra rachakhana are appointed by the monarch of Thailand, except those in the saman yok group of the ordinary class who are appointed by the supreme patriarch.

Special classes

There are four special classes:

 Chao khana rong: 13 posts available for the Mahā Nikāya sect and 7 for the Dhammayuttika Nikāya sect, being 20 in total. Members of this class have the honorific Phra prefixed to their titles, such as:

 Dharma: 30 posts available for Mahā Nikāya and 15 for Dhammayuttika Nikāya, being 45 in total. Members of this class have the honorific Phra Dharma prefixed to their titles, such as:

 Dēba: 56 posts available for Mahā Nikāya and 30 for Dhammayuttika Nikāya, being 86 in total. Members of this class have the honorific Phra Dēba prefixed to their titles, such as:

 Rāja: 135 posts available for Mahā Nikāya and 54 for Dhammayuttika Nikāya, being 189 in total. Members of this class have the honorific Phra Rāja prefixed to their titles, such as:

Ordinary class

There are 477 posts available in the ordinary class, with 348 for Mahā Nikāya and 129 for Dhammayuttika Nikāya.

Members of this class have the honorific Phra prefixed to their titles, such as:

Phra rachakhana in the ordinary class are also divided into four groups:
 Parian
 Parian-equivalent
 Vipassanā
 Saman yok

Phra khru

Phra khru is the lowest rank in the Thai sangha, divided into three classes:
 Sanyabat: appointed by the monarch of Thailand in an unlimited number.
 Thananukrom: appointed by special-class phra rachakhana in the number specified in the letter of appointment of each phra rachakhana.
 Prathuan: appointed by the Thai sangha in an unlimited number.

Holders of this rank have the honorific Phra Khru prefixed to their titles, such as:

See also
 Buddhism in Thailand

References

Buddhism in Thailand